Gojong of Goryeo (3 February 1192 – 21 July 1259), sometimes spelled Ko-tjong, was the twenty-third ruler of Goryeo in present-day Korea from 1213–1259.  Gojong's reign was marked by prolonged conflict with the Mongol Empire, which sought to conquer Goryeo, ending only to settle peace in 1259. During his reign actual power rested with the Choe family of military dictators.

Biography
Although ascending to the throne in 1213, Gojong did not wield much power until powerful advisors were killed off. In 1216, the Khitan invaded but was defeated. In August 1232, Gojong moved the capital of Goryeo from Songdo to the island of Ganghwa and started the construction of significant defenses there, in order to better defend from the Mongol threat. Gojong resisted the Mongol invasion for nearly thirty years before the kingdom was forced to make peace with the Mongols in 1259; Gojong died soon after.

In 1251, the carving of the Tripitaka Koreana, a collection of Buddhist scriptures recorded on some 81,000 wooden blocks, was completed.  The work was perhaps motivated by Gojong's hopes to change fortunes through the act of religious devotion; however the originals were later destroyed by the Mongols — the existing Tripitaka is a replica of Gojong's original, and was commissioned around one hundred years after the originals were lost.

Gojong was married to Queen Anhye, daughter of Huijong, the twenty-first king of Goryeo. His tomb is located near the city of Incheon.

Family 
Father: Gangjong of Goryeo (고려강종, 10 May 1152–26 August 1213)
Grandfather: Myeongjong of Goryeo (고려 명종)
Grandmother: Queen Uijeong of the Gim clan (의정왕후 김씨)
Mother: Queen Wondeok of the Gaeseong Wang clan (원덕왕후 왕씨; d. 1239
Grandfather: Wang Seong, Marquess Sinan (신안후왕성)
Grandmother: Princess Changrak (창락궁주, d.1216)
Consorts and their Respective issue(s):
Queen Anhye of the Yu clan (안혜왕후유씨, d.1233), his second cousin
Wonjong of Goryeo (고려원종, 5 April 1219 – 23 July 1274), first son
Yeongjong of Goryeo (고려 영종, August 1223 ), second son
Princess Suheung (수흥궁주), first daughter

In popular culture
 Portrayed by Oh Hyeon-cheol in the 2003-2004 KBS TV series Age of Warriors.
 Portrayed by Lee Seung-hyo in the 2012 MBC TV series God of War.

See also
History of Korea
Rulers of Korea
Mongol invasions of Korea

References

 

1192 births
1259 deaths
13th-century Korean monarchs
Korean Buddhist monarchs
People from Kaesong